Government bill may refer to:

Government bill (law), a bill introduced or supported by a government in a legislature
Government bond (also called a government bill), a bond issued by a national government